Vivian Hoo Kah Mun (Pha̍k-fa-sṳ: Hí Kâ-vùn; born 19 March 1990) is a Malaysian badminton player.

Career 
Teamed-up with Woon Khe Wei in the women's doubles event, they reached top 10 BWF World Ranking. Being a regular women's doubles player, Hoo has won the Commonwealth Games women's doubles event twice, first with her regular partner, Woon, at the 2014 Commonwealth Games in Glasgow and a second time with Chow Mei Kuan at the 2018 Commonwealth Games in Gold Coast. Hoo and Woon had also reached the quarter-finals of the 2016 Rio Olympics.

Personal life 
Vivian is the older sister of Hoo Pang Ron, who is also a badminton player. She is an alumna of University of Malaya.

Achievements

Commonwealth Games 
Women's doubles

Asian Games 
Women's doubles

Asian Championships 
Women's doubles

Southeast Asian Games 
Women's doubles

BWF World Junior Championships 
Mixed' doubles

BWF World Tour (1 title, 1 runner-up) 
The BWF World Tour, which was announced on 19 March 2017 and implemented in 2018, is a series of elite badminton tournaments sanctioned by the Badminton World Federation (BWF). The BWF World Tour is divided into levels of World Tour Finals, Super 1000, Super 750, Super 500, Super 300 (part of the HSBC World Tour), and the BWF Tour Super 100.

Women's doubles

BWF Grand Prix (2 titles, 2 runners-up) 
The BWF Grand Prix had two levels, the Grand Prix and Grand Prix Gold. It was a series of badminton tournaments sanctioned by the Badminton World Federation (BWF) and played between 2007 and 2017.

Women's doubles

  BWF Grand Prix Gold tournament
  BWF Grand Prix tournament

BWF International Challenge/Series (1 title, 2 runners-up) 
Women's doubles

  BWF International Challenge tournament
  BWF International Series tournament

References

External links 
 
 

1990 births
Living people
Sportspeople from Kuala Lumpur
Malaysian sportspeople of Chinese descent
Malaysian female badminton players
Badminton players at the 2016 Summer Olympics
Olympic badminton players of Malaysia
Badminton players at the 2014 Commonwealth Games
Badminton players at the 2018 Commonwealth Games
Commonwealth Games gold medallists for Malaysia
Commonwealth Games silver medallists for Malaysia
Commonwealth Games medallists in badminton
Badminton players at the 2010 Asian Games
Badminton players at the 2014 Asian Games
Asian Games bronze medalists for Malaysia
Asian Games medalists in badminton
Medalists at the 2014 Asian Games
Competitors at the 2011 Southeast Asian Games
Competitors at the 2013 Southeast Asian Games
Competitors at the 2015 Southeast Asian Games
Competitors at the 2017 Southeast Asian Games
Competitors at the 2019 Southeast Asian Games
Southeast Asian Games gold medalists for Malaysia
Southeast Asian Games silver medalists for Malaysia
Southeast Asian Games bronze medalists for Malaysia
Southeast Asian Games medalists in badminton
University of Malaya alumni
21st-century Malaysian women
Medallists at the 2014 Commonwealth Games